The Son of the Sheik is a 1926 American silent adventure/drama film directed by George Fitzmaurice and starring Rudolph Valentino and Vilma Bánky. The film is based on the 1925 romance novel The Sons of the Sheik by Edith Maude Hull, and is a sequel to the 1921 hit film The Sheik, which also stars Rudolph Valentino. The Son of the Sheik is Valentino's final film and went into general release nearly two weeks after his death from peritonitis at the age of 31.

In 2003, the film was selected for preservation in the United States National Film Registry by the Library of Congress as being "culturally, historically, or aesthetically significant". On January 1, 2022, the film went into the public domain after years of being in copyright due to the Copyright Term Extension Act.

Plot 

In his final film performance before dying in 1926, Rudolph Valentino tackles two roles, as a father and his son. Ahmed (Rudolph Valentino), the son of an Arab sheik and a kidnapped English gentlewoman (Agnes Ayres), loves local dancing girl Yasmin (Vilma Banky). When he slips out of his father's heavily guarded compound to woo her, he is kidnapped and held for ransom by a group of bandits led by Yasmin's father (George Fawcett) and Ghabah (Montagu Love), the Moor to whom she is betrothed.

Cast
 Rudolph Valentino as Ahmed (The Son) / The Sheik (Ahmed's Father)
 Vilma Bánky as Yasmin
 George Fawcett as Andre
 Montagu Love as Ghabah
 Karl Dane as Ramadan
 Bull Montana as Ali the Mountebank
 Bynunsky Hyman as Pincher the Mountebank
 Agnes Ayres as Diana, The Sheik's Wife (Ahmed's Mother)

Production
At the time of the film's release, Rudolph Valentino was attempting to make a comeback in films. He rose to international stardom after the release of The Four Horsemen of the Apocalypse and The Sheik in 1921, both of which were box-office hits and solidified his image as "the Great Lover". By 1924, however, Valentino's popularity had begun to wane after he appeared in two box office failures, Monsieur Beaucaire and A Sainted Devil, both of which featured him in roles that were a departure from his "Great Lover" image. He also squabbled over money with Famous Players-Lasky, the studio he was signed to, which eventually led to him walking out on his contract. Famous Players-Lasky eventually released Valentino from his contract and he signed with United Artists in 1925. 

In an effort to capitalize on the success that Valentino had achieved with The Sheik, United Artists' president Joseph M. Schenck bought the rights to Edith Maude Hull's novel Son of the Sheik and cast Valentino in the dual role of father and son.

Valentino was paid $100,000. The director was paid $75,000 and Frances Marion $25,000.

The novel was adapted for the screen by Frances Marion and Fred de Gresac. The film was shot on location in California and in the Yuma Desert in Arizona.

Reception

Box office
The Son of the Sheik opened at the Million Dollar Theater in Los Angeles on July 9, 1926 and played for four weeks.

Valentino then embarked on a nationwide tour to promote the film as it rolled out around the first run theatres in the country's cities. On August 15, he collapsed in his New York City hotel room and was rushed to the hospital. Doctors discovered he had a perforated ulcer which required emergency surgery. After the surgery, Valentino developed peritonitis and died on August 23, 1926.

The Son of the Sheik was put into general release nationwide on September 5, 1926, nearly two weeks after Valentino's death. The film grossed $1,000,000 within the first year of its release. Eventually it more than doubled that.

Critical
Some critics have heralded Valentino's performance in the film as one of the best of his career.

Home media
Image Entertainment released The Son of the Sheik along with The Sheik on DVD in 2002.

See also
Silent film
1926 in film

References

External links

The Son of the Sheik essay by Donna Hill at National Film Registry

Son of the Sheik at SilentEra
 
 The Son of the Sheik essay by Daniel Eagan in America's Film Legacy: The Authoritative Guide to the Landmark Movies in the National Film Registry, A&C Black, 2010 , pages 115-117

1920s adventure drama films
1926 films
American adventure drama films
American black-and-white films
American sequel films
American silent feature films
Films based on British novels
Films based on works by E. M. Hull
Films directed by George Fitzmaurice
Films shot in Arizona
Films shot in California
United Artists films
United States National Film Registry films
Films with screenplays by Frances Marion
Surviving American silent films
1926 drama films
1920s English-language films
1920s American films
Silent American drama films
Silent adventure drama films